Street installations are a form of street art and installation art. While conventional street art is done on walls and surfaces street installations use three-dimensional objects set in an urban environment. Like graffiti, it is generally non-permission based and the installation is effectively abandoned by the artist upon completion.  Street Installations sometimes have an interactive component.

Artists
Notable artist in the field include:
Above
BIBI
Banksy
Bleeps.gr
Brad Downey
El Celso
Graffiti Research Lab
Harmen de Hoop
Invader (artist)
Manfred Kielnhofer
Lennie Lee
Leon Reid IV
Mark Divo
Mark Jenkins
Joe Mangrum
Mark McGowan
Nsumi
Paige Smith (A Common Name)
TEJN
Dan Witz

See also
Art intervention
Culture jamming
Installation art
Lock On street sculptures

References

External links
 Wooster Collective's sub-category for street installations 
 New York Times article about the 2006 street art show at 11 Spring in New York's SoHo, which includes references to various installation artists

Graffiti and unauthorised signage
Installation art
Installation